Paradise Disowned is an album by the Welsh ambient musician Lustmord, released in 1986. Unlike his later albums, this album is produced with conventional instrumentation (vocals, pipes, percussion, and "machinery"), containing drone textures. Soleilmoon reissued this album in 2000, updating the cover art.

Track listing

Personnel 
Adapted from Discogs
 Michael Wells – artwork
 David Black – cover
 Roy Batty – drum programming, noises
 Ach Topkaf – location engineer
 Aleister Farrent – mixing engineer
 James Bradell – recording engineer
 Kevin Metcalfe – mastering
 Isolrubin BK – noises, location recordings tape
 John Murphy – noises, electronics, loops, voice, gong, shawm, musical bow
 Lustmørd – noises, electronics, pipe, machinery, voice, gong, cover, location recordings tape
 Dr N. Newby-Carter – deep sea recordings tape

References 

 

1986 albums
Lustmord albums